The Cafe is a talk show aimed at young people in Ireland. The show debuted in 2004. It was broadcast on RTÉ Two each Friday evening at 19:00, having switched from its previous location in the Thursday scheduling from 7 November 2008.

It was presented by Aidan Power, although Laura Woods and Liam McCormack were his previous co-presenters. The waitress was Avril Kelly, who served drinks to the audience and guests and acts as the announcer of what would occur following the commercial break.opening .

Chats were conducted with two or three guests, there were comic inserts and a musical performance rounded off the show (although sometimes a musical performance may have started the show a well). Past guests included Jason Byrne and Donna and Joseph McCaul, PJ Gallagher and Tom McGurk, Glen Wallace and Jennifer Metcalfe, Caroline Morahan, Amanda Byram, Michelle Heaton, Nicola McLean, Daithí Ó Sé, The Kinetiks, The Coronas, Rosanna Davision, Jacob Byrne, Oliver Callan (aka Gay Byrne) and Pat Kenny, wrestlers Scotty 2 Hotty and Joe Legend, The Saw Doctors, panellist John Bishop and Skins actors Mike Bailey, Daniel Kaluuya and Larissa Wilson.

The Cafe completed transmission of its fifth season on 27 March 2009. A sixth season was revealed on 14 August 2009 by Aidan Power to be on the way. The last episode was broadcast on 2 April 2010 due to its axing by RTÉ to make way for new programming.

Season one

Season two
Guests in season two included Keith Duffy, Adam Woodyatt, Tony Fenton, Nicholas Hoult, Marty Whelan, Ronnie Drew, Larry Gogan and Liz Bonnin. Music was provided by Turn, Ham Sandwich, Gemma Hayes, Luan Parle, The Answer, Katie Melua and Damien Dempsey.

Exam specials

1. Byrne was hired as a waiter for these five episodes. He served coffee to The Cafe'''s guests.

Season three
Season three included twenty-seven editions of The Cafe, thirteen of which were in 2006 and fourteen of which were in 2007. Among those to provide music were Director, Messiah J & The Expert, The Frank and Walters, Fionn Regan, The Blizzards, Boss Volenti, The Coronas, Vyvienne Long, Luan Parle, Delorentos, Iain Archer and Royseven

{| class="wikitable" style="font-size:90%"
|- bgcolor="#CCCCCC"
| Date of transmission || Guests || Artist || Song || Details
|-
| 28 September 2006 || Spiral, Bernard O'Shea, Sinéad Beirne || Spiral || "So Sexy" || Details
|-
| 5 October 2006 || Oliver Callan, Mickey Harte, Bubble Hits (James Hyland and Lee Walsh) || Mickey Harte || "Can't Let Go" || Details
|-
| 12 October 2006 || Mr. Ireland (Simon Hales), Rasher || In-Flight Safety || "Surround" || Details
|-
| 19 October 2006 || Brent Pope, Bernard O'Shea, Mark Pollock || Director || "Come with a Friend" || Details
|-
| 26 October 2006 || Bronagh Gallagher, Oliver Callan, Irish Ghostbusters || Nylon || "Closer" || Details
|-
| 2 November 2006 || Oliver Callan, Jimmy Magee, Jack Wise || Superjimenez || "Helicopters" || Details
|-
| 9 November 2006 || Oliver Callan, Joe Duffy, Tadhg Kennelly || Messiah J & The Expert || "Something Outta Nothing" || Details
|-
| 16 November 2006 || Fitzy, Karl Spain, Oliver Callan, GP Taylor || The Frank and Walters || "Miles and Miles" || Details
|-
| 23 November 2006 || TJ and TJ, Fair City's Barry, Jo and Heather (Patrick David Nolan, Rachel Sarah Murphy and Una Kavanagh), Kieran Donaghy and Aidan O'Mahony || Republic of Loose || "The Idiots" || Details
|-
| 30 November 2006 || Jason Byrne, Robin Cousins || Neosupervital || "Now That I Found It" || Details
|-
| 7 December 2006 || Gary Cooke, Oliver Callan, Bryan Dobson || Fionn Regan || "Put a Penny in the Slot" || Details
|-
| 14 (17?) December 2006 || Maeve Higgins, Jack Wise, PJ Gallagher || The Charlatans and Jake Stevens || "Blackened Blue Eyes" and"Merry Christmas Jakey Boy" || Details
|-
| 21 December 2006 || Fran Cosgrave, Oliver Callan, Keith Barry || The Blizzards || "Fantasy" || Details
|-
| 1 January 2007 || Oliver Callan as Joe Duffy in an end of year Top 10 review ||  ||  || Details
|-
| 18 January 2007 || Ryan Tubridy, Oliver Callan, Dave Coffey || David Kitt || "One Clear Way" || Details
|-
| 25 January 2007 || Bill O'Herlihy, Oliver Callan, Ben Ramazani || Mista.BNG and Boss Volenti || "Stronger Than Before"and "The Gun" || Details
|-
| 1 February 2007 || Briain Gleeson and Charlene Gleeson and Tara Leinston (Trouble in Paradise), Oliver Callan, Eamon Horan and Brendan Fanning || The Coronas || "Decision Time" || Details
|-
| 8 February 2007 || Derval O'Rourke, Oliver Callan, Blind Date || Vyvienne Long || "She Wants to Move" || Details
|-
| 15 February 2007 || Blind Date Catch Up, Dáithí Ó Sé, TJ and TJ, Monica Loughman || Luan Parle || "Make It on My Own" || Details
|-
| 22 February 2007 || Oliver Callan, Keith Duffy and Brian Ormond, TJ and TJ, Paul Howard || My Alamo || "1994" || Details
|-
| 1 March 2007 || Louis Walsh, Kevin J Ryan, Bernard O'Shea, Manchán Magan || Delorentos || "Basis of Everything" || Details
|-
| 8 March 2007 || Colm & Jim-Jim, Oliver Callan, Baz/Michael/Mark (How Low Can You Go?) || Iain Archer || "Minus Ten" || Details
|-
| 15 March 2007 || James Alexandrou, TJ and TJ, Oliver Callan, You're a Star || Royseven || "Crash" || Details
|-
| 22 March 2007 || Caroline Morahan, TJ and TJ, Raj Khan, Oliver Callan, Gavin McConnon and Emmet O'Brien || The Cooper Temple Clause || "Waiting Game" || Details
|-
| 29 March 2007 || Lucy Kennedy, Bernard O'Shea, George McMahon, Oliver Callan, Gavin McConnon and Emmet O'Brien || J-90 || "Freak" || Details
|-
| 12 April 2007 || Ken Doherty, Oliver Callan, Bernard Dunne || Discovery Gospel Choir and The Rags || "I Still Haven't FoundWhat I'm Looking For"and "Monsters & I" || Details
|-
| 19 April 2007 || Brian McFadden, Oliver Callan, Don Wycherley || Brian McFadden || "Like Only a Woman Can" and "Jones" || Details
|-
|}The Best of the CafeThroughout June and July 2007, RTÉ broadcast six special editions of The Cafe. These included past interviews and performances.

Season four
For season four, Aidan Power's co-presenter Laura Woods left for pastures new and was replaced by Liam McCormack. On 25 October Ziggy Lichman guest presented instead of Aidan Power, alongside Liam McCormack. The opening sequence also changed to feature past guests such as The Blizzards, Lucy Kennedy and Ken Doherty in black and white. Among those to provide music were Duke Special, Messiah J and the Expert, The Flaws, Declan O'Rourke, Republic of Loose, East 17, Juno Falls, David Geraghty and Seasick Steve.The Cafe SelectThroughout June, July and into August 2008, RTÉ broadcast six special editions of The Cafe. These included past interviews and performances.

Season five
For season five, Aidan Power's co-presenter Liam McCormack left for pastures new and wasn't replaced as Power became the show's sole presenter.  The 7 November episode marked the beginning of Friday broadcasts, this change would remain in effect until the programme's end in 2010. Among those to provide music were Republic of Loose, The Flaws, Fight Like Apes, Ham Sandwich, The Blizzards and The Coronas.

Olympian Kenny Egan produced his silver medal. Economist George Lee was shown predicting doom and gloom sixteen years earlier Pat Kenny featured on the night of The Late Late Toy Show where he encountered the mimicry of Oliver Callan who took on the persona of Kenny and his predecessor Gay Byrne. Ryle Nugent guested on 20 March 2009 to talk about Ireland's attempt to win the 2009 Six Nations Championship Grand Slam. The final episode of the fifth series was broadcast on 27 March 2009, featuring guests Eamon Dunphy and John Bishop, with music from Republic of Loose and a new Louis Walsh girlband.

Season six
Keith Duffy appeared to promote the stage show My First Time''; this was cancelled after the sudden death of fellow Boyzone member Stephen Gately the following day.

Guests on the final episode, aired on 26 March 2010, were Katie Taylor, Daithi O'Se, Kathryn Thomas, Andrew Stanley and Dustin the Turkey, with music from Smash Hits and Beardyman.

References

External links
 The Cafe at RTÉ Television

2004 Irish television series debuts
2010 Irish television series endings
Irish television talk shows
RTÉ original programming